Molly Aguirre (born September 10, 1984) is a professional snowboarder and member of the U.S. Snowboarding Team, specializing in halfpipe events.

Besides halfpipe, Aguirre also snowboards slopestyle, grind/rail, and quarter pipe events.  She was the first female snowboarder to perform a backside 900 in competition.

Career 
Aguirre's first pro event was in 2002. She later left Burton and made the transfer to DC. In 2009, she stepped aside from snowboarding to pursue a career in nursing. Aguirre attended nursing school at California State University Channel Islands.

References

External links

Lat34 Interview: Meet The Aguirres
Shred Betties Interview with Molly Aguirre
http://www.smithoptics.com/team.html?id=16

American female snowboarders
1984 births
Living people
Sportspeople from Duluth, Minnesota
People from Mammoth Lakes, California
21st-century American women